Zhao Rong (born 2 August 1991) is a Chinese football player who is a forward.

International goals

External links 
 

1991 births
Living people
Chinese women's footballers
China women's international footballers
2015 FIFA Women's World Cup players
Footballers at the 2016 Summer Olympics
Footballers from Anhui
Women's association football forwards
Olympic footballers of China
Beijing BG Phoenix F.C. players
Footballers at the 2018 Asian Games
Asian Games silver medalists for China
Asian Games medalists in football
Medalists at the 2018 Asian Games
Universiade gold medalists for China
Universiade medalists in football
Changchun Zhuoyue players
Medalists at the 2011 Summer Universiade